Good Girl was a K-pop music competition television program that aired on Mnet from May 2020 to July 2020 in South Korea.

Cast
 Ailee
 Cheetah
 Hyoyeon (Girls' Generation)
 Jamie
 Jeon Ji-woo (Kard)
 Lee Young-ji
 Queen Wasabii
 Sleeq
 Jang Ye-eun (CLC)
 Yunhway

Overview
Popular female hip-hop and R&B artists of South Korea gather to compete as a team against other South Korean musicians to win a cash prize.

Discography

Good Girl Episode 1

Good Girl Episode 2

Good Girl Episode 3

Good Girl Episode 4

Good Girl Final

Ratings

References

External links 
  

2020 South Korean television series debuts
2020 South Korean television series endings
Korean-language television shows
South Korean music television shows
Mnet (TV channel) original programming
Hip hop television